Fliggo was a video sharing website where users could create their own private video sharing site. Users could choose who had access to their videos and what they could do on their site. The site eventually merged with video sharing website Vidly, which was later renamed Twitvid.io.

The website was founded in October 2007 by Chrys Bader and Daniel Rhodes and became incorporated in July 2008. Fliggo publicly launched on February 25, 2009 and was relatively well received. Tech Crunch gave an overall positive view of the website but commented that the website had the potential to become "a magnet for videos taken down for copyright violations elsewhere or porn". In September 17, 2009 the site announced that it would merge with Vidly, another video website they run, in November of that same year.

References

External links
 Fliggo

Video hosting